Okido may refer to:
 Okido (magazine), British children's magazine
 Ōkido Moriemon (1878-1930), Japanese sumo wrestler

See also
Messy Goes to Okido, British children's TV series